"FAB is a song by American R&B singer-songwriter JoJo featuring American rapper Remy Ma from her third studio album Mad Love (2016). FAB is an acronym for Fake Ass Bitches. It was written by Joanna Levesque, Jussi Karvinen, Hayley Warner, Jason Dean, Joseph Kirkland and Reminisce Smith, while production was helmed by Jussifer. The song was released as the second single from the album on September 22, 2016. Musically, "FAB" is a mid-tempo pop song with R&B influences. Lyrically, the song is an anthem that rallies against all "fake ass bitches", but also celebrates the "real ones".

The song received generally positive reviews from contemporary music critics, with many praising its direct content matter. The song performed moderately following its release and only charted in US Billboard Digital Pop Song's chart, peaking at number 28. The song's accompanying music video was directed by Wes Temhone and shot in New York. It premiered on JoJo's official YouTube channel on November 29, 2016. JoJo performed "FAB" for the first time on MTV's Wonderland on September 30, 2016. A digital remixes EP containing 5 official remixes of the song was released on March 3, 2017.

Background
JoJo conceptualized the song at the gym while running on the treadmill. JoJo compared her experience with the music industry with that of high school, "I was literally singing in my head, and I was like I can't stand these fake ass bitches in my face. I was like, you know what? I'm not cut out for the shmoozing and the fakeness. I literally can't stand it. I know I'm not the only one that can relate to that."

Although the song is an anthem for calling out fake people in one's life, the track is not just about one gender, but also meant to be a celebration, as JoJo states, "This song is very direct... We've all encountered fake ass bitches, no matter the gender. So I wrote a song about it, calling them out but also celebrating the real ones."

Following Remy's release from prison, JoJo sought her out, calling her one of her favorite rappers.

Composition
"FAB" was written by Hayley Warner, Jussi Karvinen, Jason Dean, Joseph Kirkland, Reminisce Smith and Joanna "JoJo" Levesque for the latter's long-awaited third studio album Mad Love (2016). The song includes additional vocals from American rapper Remy Ma. It was produced by Jussifer, who also contributed to the song's programming. The track was recorded with guidance by Ryan Gladieux in Atlantic Studios in Los Angeles, California. The mixing of "FAB" was done by Adam Hawkins at Acacia Sound in Los Angeles, California and eventually, the mastering was done by Tom Coyne at Sterling Sound in New York. JoJo served as the song's vocal producer.

Critical reception
"FAB" received generally positive reviews from contemporary music critics; several publications coined the track as an anthem. Myles Tanzer from The Fader magazine called the track a "no haters anthem", commending the direct nature of the song's "annihilating" opening verse. Danny Schwartz of HotNewHipHop called it a "takedown of 'fake ass bitches'". Bianca Gracie from Fuse TV regarded the song as a "bare bones track". Idolator's Robbie Daw claimed the song as JoJo's "catchiest pop cut" since the release of "insanely underrated" Tringle cut "When Love Hurts" in 2015. Daw went on to compare the song's melody to Nico & Vinz's "Am I Wrong".

In a review for Clash magazine, Shahzaib Hussain called the song a "gutsier, R&B-inflected mid-tempo... which sees her go off on Instagram millennials and clones". Madeline Roth from MTV News provided a positive review for the "fiery" tune, praising JoJo's approach from light commands like "Leave (Get Out)" and has "graduated to full-on blasting". Roth went on to praise Remy's "flawless bars that leave no room for interpretation", calling the use of her term ‘fraud broads’ "praise-worthy all on its own". In writing for The Guardians The Observer  Michael Cragg described the song as a "bolshy strut". in a less positive review of the album, Vanessa Okoth-Obbo called the album's lead singles "Fuck Apologies." and "F.A.B."  "obvious ploys for radio rotation". Continuing "The former comes complete with a tame Wiz Khalifa verse, while the latter boasts an always welcome contribution from Remy Ma. From a different artist, these songs might sound like pre-packaged attempts to jump on the same bandwagon that she decries in "F.A.B."

Release
"FAB" made its premiere exclusively through The Fader on September 22, 2016, as the second promotional single from Mad Love (2016). JoJo shared the single's cover artwork on her social channels. Although never officially released as a single to radio, a digital remix EP containing 5 official remixes of the song was released on March 5, 2017, including version by Kemist, RealOnes, DJ Braindead, Giovanny and Wixard.

Music video
During a Facebook live Q&A JoJo announced plans to shoot visuals for another song off the album, most likely FAB. On November 29, 2016, In conjunction with the announcement of the Mad Love Tour, JoJo premiered the music video for the song on her official YouTube Channel. The music video was shot in New York on October 15, 2016 with Director Wes Temhone.

Originally shot in colour but later converted to a black-and-white visual to better convey the song. "JoJo shows all sorts of sass as she sings the anthem among the streets of New York City. And with a saucy addition from Remy Ma in the middle of the clip, there's plenty of inspiration to tell your own haters off in a short three-and-a-half-minutes".

Live performance
On September 30, 2016, JoJo made her first televised performance of the song on MTV's newest music show "Wonderland", where she also performed album cuts for the first time including "Fuck Apologies" and "Mad Love". JoJo performed for various radio shows and publications including, Billboard's Live Facebook Stream on October 14, Paper Magazine on October 15 and Perez Hilton's "Perez TV" on October 24 among others. On November 5, 2016, she performed the song live for Revolt TV's "Revolt Sessions" music show. In promotion for the album, the song was included in the set list for JoJo's Mad Love World Tour.

Track listing

Credits and personnel
Credits adapted from the liner notes of Mad Love.

Recording
Recorded at Atlantic Studios, Los Angeles, California
Mixed at Acacia Sound, Los Angeles, California
Mastered at Sterling Sound, New York City, New York

Personnel
JoJo – vocals, writing, vocal production
Jussi Karvinen – writing 
Hayley Warner – writing
Jason Dean – writing
Reminisce Smith – writing, vocals
Joseph Kirkland – writing
Adam Hawkins – mixing
Ryan Gladieux – recording
Jussifer – producer, programmer
Tom Coyne – audio mastering

Charts

Release history

References

2016 singles
2016 songs
JoJo (singer) songs
Remy Ma songs
Songs written by Remy Ma
Songs written by Hayley Warner
Atlantic Records singles
Songs written by Jussifer
Songs written by JoJo (singer)